Route 3 is a national route of Uruguay. In 1975, it was assigned the name General José Artigas, the foremost national hero of Uruguay. It is one of the most important highways in the country along with Route 5, connecting the south coast near Rafael Perazza with Bella Unión in the extreme northwest.

Although Route 3 starts at Km. 67 of Route 1, its distance notation uses the same Kilometre Zero reference as Routes 1, 5, 6, 7, 8, 9 and IB, which is the Pillar of Peace of Plaza de Cagancha in the Centro of Montevideo.

Destinations and junctions

These are the populated places Route 3 passes through, as well as its main junctions with other National Roads.
San José Department
Km. 67 of Route 1, between Puntas de Valdez & Rafael Perazza.
Km. 90 San José de Mayo, Route 11 West to Ecilda Paullier and East to Atlántida.
Flores Department
Km. 189 Trinidad, Route 14 West to Mercedes and East to Durazno and La Coronilla at the coast of Rocha.
Km. 238 crosses Río Negro and enters Río Negro Department.
Río Negro Department
Km. 317 Young Route 25 South to Route 24 and North to Route 90.
Paysandú Department
Km. 376 Paysandú, Route 90 East.
Km. 381 a 6 km road connects it with International Bridge General Artigas into Route 135 of Argentina.
Km. 410 Route 26 East-Southeast to Tacuarembó and Melo.
Km. 441 Termas de Guaviyú
Salto Department
Km. 488 Termas del Daymán
Km. 496 Salto, Route 31 Southeast to Tacuarembó.
Artigas Department
Km. 636 Route 30 Northeast to Artigas.
Km. 659 Bella Unión - connects to Brazilian Federal Road BR-472.

References

External links

Viajando Por Uruguay, Rutas del Uruguay. Hoy; Ruta 3

Roads in Uruguay